State Route 221 (SR 221) is a  east-west state highway in Crockett County, Tennessee, connecting the towns of Alamo and Gadsden. For the majority of its length, SR 221 is known as Alamo Gadsden Road.

Route description

SR 221 begins in downtown Alamo at an intersection with SR 54 and SR 88. It goes east through neighborhoods as E Church Street before leaving Alamo and passing through farmland and rural areas as Alamo Gadsden Road. It goes due east for several miles, where it crosses over a large creek, before turning southeast at a Y-Intersection with Emerson Road to enter Gadsden. The highway enters town along Quincy Street and passes by some homes before coming to an end at an intersection with US 70A/US 79/SR 76. The entire route of SR 221 is a two-lane highway.

Major intersections

References

221
Transportation in Crockett County, Tennessee